Lăcustă is a Romanian surname. Notable people with the surname include:

 Florian Dan Lăcustă (born 1977), Romanian footballer
 Larisa Lăcustă (born 1979), Romanian swimmer

Romanian-language surnames